Linn Maria Grant (born 20 June 1999) is a Swedish professional golfer who plays on the LPGA Tour and Ladies European Tour. As an amateur, she won the 2017 Ladies' British Open Amateur Stroke Play Championship and was in contention at the 2018 and 2020 U.S. Women's Open.

Family and early years
Grant is the grand-daughter of James Grant, a Scottish golf professional who emigrated from Inverness in Scotland to Helsingborg in Sweden. The Grant family has had a fair bit of success on Catriona Matthew's home track, North Berwick Golf Club. James won the Scottish Boys Championship on the course, and Linn won the British Amateur Stroke Play Championship there, 49 years later. James died when Linn was 6 years old. Her father John played on the Swedish Golf Tour and has seven wins on the Swedish Senior Tour.

Amateur career
Grant joined the Swedish National Team in 2016 and represented her country at the European Girls' Team Championship, where Sweden was runner-up 2016 and winner in 2017. She was part of the 3rd place team at the World Junior Girls Championship in Canada 2017. She was then part of the Swedish teams that won the European Ladies' Team Championship a record three times in 2018, 2019 and 2020, teamed with Frida Kinhult, Sara Kjellker, Amanda Linnér, Maja Stark and Beatrice Wallin.

She also excelled individually. In 2016 she won the Doral-Publix Junior Classic and the Junior Masters Invitational. In 2017 she won the German Girls Open and recorded a season's Scottish double as she won the Helen Holm Scottish Women's Open Championship at Royal Troon by five strokes and the Ladies' British Open Amateur Stroke Play Championship at North Berwick Golf Club.

She was runner-up at the 2018 Major Champions Invitational in Florida, finished tied for fifth at the 2019 European Ladies Amateur Championship and was a semifinalist at the 2019 British Ladies Amateur. Her achievements earned her an invitation to play at the inaugural Augusta National Women's Amateur in 2019.

Grant was a member of the 2017 European Junior Solheim Cup team and represented the Continent of Europe on the winning 2019 Vagliano Trophy team. She was selected to represent the International Team at the 2020 Arnold Palmer Cup.

In 2018, Grant won the qualification for the 2018 Women's British Open at St Annes Old Links Golf Club with a round of 62 (−10), however she missed the cut in the Women's Open at Royal Lytham & St Annes Golf Club after rounds of 78 and 72. She also won the sectional qualification for the 2018 U.S. Women's Open at Buckinghamshire Golf Club with rounds of 67 and 70, seven strokes ahead of the runner-up Catriona Matthew and nine ahead of the third qualifier Mel Reid. In the U.S. Open at Shoal Creek Club, Grant was tied for fourth and best amateur after opening rounds of 69 and 72, and finished tied for 57th after final rounds of 78 and 81.

Grant was a freshman at Arizona State University in 2019–20, along with compatriot Amanda Linnér. She won her first varsity tournament for the Arizona State Sun Devils at the Dr Donnis Thompson Invitational in Honolulu in March 2020.

Over the summer in 2020, she played on the Nordic Golf Tour where she won the GolfUppsala Open. She lost in a playoff to Ingrid Lindblad at the 2020 Skaftö Open, but a few weeks later won the Swedish Matchplay Championship, just like Anna Nordqvist, Caroline Hedwall, Maria Hjorth, Helen Alfredsson and Liselotte Neumann before her. With the win, Grant secured victory in the 2020 Nordic Golf Tour Order of Merit, named the Road to Creekhouse Ladies Open, still an amateur not allowed to receive prize money, and a spot at the Creekhouse Ladies Open at Kristianstad Golf Club on the 2021 Ladies European Tour. She was ranked 5th on the World Amateur Golf Ranking.

Playing with the Arizona State Sun Devils, Grant won three consecutive individual tournament titles in the spring of 2021.

Professional career
Grant announced her turning professional in August 2021, ranked 4th in the World Amateur Golf Ranking. In her first month as a professional, Grant claimed two successive second-place finishes on the Ladies European Tour, at the Skaftö Open and the Creekhouse Ladies Open. In October she won her first tournament as a professional, the Terre Blanche Ladies Open in France.

In December 2021, she earned her LPGA Tour card at the LPGA Final Qualifying Tournament. 

In February 2022, Grant won two titles on the Sunshine Ladies Tour in South Africa. In March, she won her first Ladies European Tour title at the co-sanctioned the Joburg Ladies Open. After a tie for 7th at the season-ending Investec South African Women's Open she captured the Sunshine Ladies Tour's Order of Merit title, ahead of Lee-Anne Pace.

In June 2022, Grant became the first woman to win on the European Tour, at the time named the DP World Tour, by winning the Volvo Car Scandinavian Mixed at Halmstad Golf Club in Sweden, a tournament with a field mixed of 78 women and 78 men, playing from different tees for the same title and the same prize money, but divided when counting for the women on the Ladies European Tour and for the men on the European Tour. Grant went into the final round with a two shot lead, and went on to score an 8-under-par 64 in the last round, and to win by nine strokes ahead of the nearest men and 14 strokes ahead of the nearest women.

After finishing runner-up in 2020 and 2021, Grant won the 2022 Skaftö Open by one stroke ahead of Lisa Pettersson.

Grant played only six events in her rookie season on the LPGA Tour in 2022, garnering four top-10 finishes in the process. Although accumulating enough points to qualify for the CME Group Tour Championship, Grant did not participate in the tour's season-ending event due to her COVID vaccination status. Grant said through a statement via her agent, "with travel restrictions to enter the U.S. still remaining, it is still not an option for me to play LPGA events in the U.S. This is the sole reason I am not playing the CME."

Amateur wins
2016 Skandia Tour Elit #5, Junior Masters Invitational, Doral-Publix Junior Classic
2017 Helen Holm Scottish Women's Open Championship, German Girls Open, Ladies' British Open Amateur Stroke Play Championship
2020 Dr. Donnis Thompson Invitational
2021 Sun Devil Winter Classic, Bruin Wave Invitational, The Clover Cup

Source:

Professional wins (9)

Ladies European Tour wins (4)

1Co-sanctioned by the Sunshine Ladies Tour
2Mixed event with the European Tour

Sunshine Ladies Tour wins (3)

1Co-sanctioned by the Ladies European Tour

LET Access Series wins (1)

Nordic Golf Tour (2)

Results in LPGA majors

 

CUT = missed the half-way cut
T = tied

World ranking 
Position in Women's World Golf Rankings at the end of each calendar year.

Team appearances
Amateur
European Girls' Team Championship (representing Sweden): 2016, 2017 (winners)
European Ladies' Team Championship (representing Sweden): 2018 (winners), 2019 (winners), 2020 (winners), 2021
World Junior Girls Championship (representing Sweden): 2016, 2017
Junior Solheim Cup (representing Europe): 2017
Espirito Santo Trophy (representing Sweden): 2018
Vagliano Trophy (representing the Continent of Europe): 2019 (winners)
Arnold Palmer Cup (representing the International Team): 2020 (winners)

Source:

References

External links
Linn Grant at the World Amateur Golf Rankings official site 

Linn Grant at the Arizona State University Sun Devils official site

Swedish female golfers
Arizona State Sun Devils women's golfers
LPGA Tour golfers
Ladies European Tour golfers
Sportspeople from Helsingborg
1999 births
Living people
20th-century Swedish women
21st-century Swedish women